Winfried Rief (* 12. Mai 1959) is a German psychologist. Since 2000 he has been a professor of clinical psychology and psychotherapy at the University of Marburg. Rief's research examines the psychological factors involved in the development, maintenance and management of physical complaints, including investigations of somatic symptom disorders and placebo effects. Rief is the founding editor of the academic journal Clinical Psychology in Europe.

Biography 
Rief studied psychology at the University of Trier (1979-1984). Then he worked at the research division of the psychiatric hospital Reichenau at the University of Konstanz, where he received his Ph.D. in 1987. The title of the thesis was "Visual Information Processing in Schizophrenics". He completed his habilitation in 1994 at the University of Salzburg (title: "Somatoform disorders and hypochondria"). As a clinician, he worked at the Rottweil Psychiatric Hospital (1986-1987) and at the Roseneck Medical-Psychosomatic Hospital (Prien am Chiemsee; affiliated with the L.M. University of Munich), where he became a senior psychologist in 1989. Rief accepted a professorship in clinical psychology and psychotherapy at the University of Marburg in 2000. In the following years, he was a visiting professor at the Harvard Medical School in Boston (2004-2005), the University of California in San Diego (2009/2010), and the University of Auckland in New Zealand (2002).

Rief is spokesperson of the Commission "Psychology and Psychotherapy Training" of the German Society for Psychology (DGPs) and advocates, among other things, a revision of the Psychotherapists Act, which was finally approved by the German Bundestag in 2019. He was also President of the German Society of Behavioural Medicine for several years (2001-2005). He was also nominated as a member of the expert commission of the American Psychiatric Association (APA) and World Health Organization (WHO) "Somatic Presentations of Mental Disorders" for the preparation of DSM-5 (Beijing, 2006).

In addition, he is spokesperson of the DFG Research Group on Placebo and Nocebo Mechanisms (2010-2019), member of the DFG Review Board (2012-2020), and of the DFG Commission "Clinical Trials". He co-chairs the ICD-11 Working Group on "Classification of Chronic Pain" of the WHO (since 2013). He is editor in chief of the journal Clinical Psychology in Europe. Rief is a board member of the European Association of Clinical Psychology and Psychological Treatment EACLIPT.

Rief was awarded the Distinguished International Affiliate, APA Division Health Psychology in 2014 and received a Distinguished Scientist Award from the International Society of Behavioral Medicine in 2014. Rief was awarded the Alison Creed Award by the European Association of Psychosomatic Medicine in 2020.

Research work 
For many years, Rief's scientific work focused on the investigation of psychological factors in the development, maintenance and management of physical complaints. He is one of the leading scientists on somatoform disorders and, per Web of Science, leads the international publication list on this topic. Together with Prof. Hiller (Mainz) he developed the frequently used questionnaire procedure SOMS (Screening for Somatoform Symptoms). As a nominated member of the Initial Group for the reformulation of the concept of somatoform symptom and associated in DSM-5, he was initially involved in this process, but later clearly criticized the concept of "somatic stress disorders" in DSM-5 presented in 2014.
  
In 2009, the German version of ICD-10 introduced the new diagnosis F45.41 "Chronic pain with mental and somatic factors". This introduction was the result of a working group chaired by Prof. Rief. As co-chair together with R.-D. Treede he also chaired the working group on the classification of chronic pain in ICD-11. The classification proposal of this working group for chronic pain was officially included in the draft for ICD-11 by the World Health Assembly 2019, which will become the worldwide basis for the classification of physical and mental diseases.

Since 2004, he has increasingly expanded his research focus to the topic of placebo and nocebo mechanisms in medical interventions and since 2010 has headed a corresponding transregional DFG research group (DFG 1328). He was able to prove that patient expectations contributed significantly to the success of treatment, even in highly invasive medical interventions (such as cardiac surgery), and that modifying these patient expectations increases the success of such interventions. However, patient expectations are also essential for the development of side effects. Book publications on the subject of "biofeedback" (Rief & Birbaumer, 2000; 2006; 2010), somatisation disorder (Rief & Hiller, 2011) or on the subject of "psychosomatics and behavioural medicine" (Rief & Henningsen, 2015).

Rief was also a member of the initiative group for the foundation of a European Society of Clinical Psychology and is a board member of the European Association of Clinical Psychology and Psychological Treatment. As Editor in Chief he launched the journal Clinical Psychology in Europe.

While the corona pandemic, he published a website for the German Society for Psychology (DGPs) with information for everyone who has fears and uncertainties in the corona situation and especially when making vaccination decisions. The page contains information on fears about vaccinations, why they are normal, but also what influence the media and individual reports of side effects have. For example, a study on a vaccine showed that participants who received a placebo vaccine reported side effects from the vaccination.

The site also includes tips for dealing with such anxiety.

References

External links 
 

Year of birth missing (living people)
Living people
German psychologists
Clinical psychologists
Academic staff of the University of Marburg